Monte Vidon Combatte is a comune (municipality) in the Province of Fermo in the Italian region Marche, located about  south of Ancona and about  north of Ascoli Piceno. 

Monte Vidon Combatte borders the following municipalities: Carassai, Monte Giberto, Montottone, Ortezzano, Petritoli.

References

Cities and towns in the Marche